Koa is a species of tree endemic to Hawaii.
Koa or KOA may also refer to:
 Koa people, an ethnic group of Australia
 Guwa language, or Koa, an Australian language
 Koya language, or Koa, a language of India
 Kona International Airport, IATA code: KOA, an airport in Hawaii
 KOA (AM), an American radio station
 KCNC-TV, an American television station, which used the call signs KOA or KOA-TV until August 1983
 Kampgrounds of America, a franchise chain of North American campgrounds
 Kick Off Association, an organization for fans of the soccer simulation computer game Kick Off
Kingdoms of Amalur: Reckoning, a 2012 video game
 KOA Corporation of Japan